The Blessed, also known as  Les Bienheureux, is an Algerian movie that shows a family living in the aftermath of the Algerian war also known as 'the dirty war'.

Synopsis 
Set in 24 hours, the movie centers on a couple who happens to be celebrating their twentieth anniversary and plans a date in a restaurant. The couple gets into a disagreement concerning whether or not to send their son abroad for schooling and they decide to ask their friends about it during the night out. During the dinner, the topic is brought up and it ends up with each of them opining their perspectives concerning the war and country's future.

Cast 

 Sami Bouajila
 Nadia Kaci
 Adam Bessa
 Amine Lansari
 Lyna Khoudri
 Faouzi Bensaïdi 
 Hadjar Benmansour
 Salima Abada
 Abdelkader Affak
 Mohamed Ali Allalou

Awards and nominations 
*Göteborg Film Festival (2018)

International Debut Award [Nominee]

Sofia Djama

*AMAA 2018 Award

Best Young/Promising Actor

Anine Lansari [winner]

*Hamburg Film Festival (2018)

Political Film Award [Nominee]

Sofia Djama

*Lumiere Awards, France (2018)

Heike Hurst Award [Nominee]

Best First Film (Meilleur premier film)

Sofia Djama

*Minneapolis St. Paul International Film Festival (2018)

Emerging Filmmaker Award [Winner]

Sofia Djama

*Seattle International Film Festival (2018)

New Directors Competition [Nominee]

Sofia Djama

*Venice Film Festival (2017)

Brian Award [Winner]

Sofia Djama

Lina Mangiacapre Award [Winner]

Sofia Djama

Venice Horizons Award [Winner]

Best Actress

Lyna Khoudri

Venice Horizons Award [Nominee]

Best Film

Sofia Djama

References